The 1974 LSU Tigers football team represented Louisiana State University (LSU) during the 1974 NCAA Division I football season.  Under head coach Charles McClendon, the Tigers had a record of 5–5–1 with a Southeastern Conference record of 2–4. It was McClendon's thirteenth season as head coach at LSU.

Schedule

Roster

References

LSU
LSU Tigers football seasons
LSU Tigers football